Jorge Cortés is a Spanish engineer and professor at the Department of Mechanical and Aerospace Engineering, University of California, San Diego. He is the author of Geometric, Control and Numerical Aspects of Nonholonomic Systems.

Education and career
In 2001, Jorge Cortés received his Ph.D. in engineering mathematics from Charles III University of Madrid. He became a postdoctoral research associate at the University of Twente from 2001 to 2002, and continued his postdoctoral research at the University of Illinois at Urbana-Champaign from 2002 to 2004. He then worked as an assistant professor at University of California, Santa Cruz from 2004 to 2007. He subsequently joined the University of California, San Diego faculty as a professor.

Awards and honors
He was elected SIAM fellow in 2020. The IEEE granted him an equivalent honor in 2014.

References

External links

Fellow Members of the IEEE
University of California, Santa Cruz faculty
University of California, San Diego faculty
Spanish expatriates in the United States
Spanish engineers
Fellows of the Society for Industrial and Applied Mathematics
Charles III University of Madrid alumni
Year of birth missing (living people)
Living people